Nexcom Bulgaria, LLC is a licensed telecommunications operator, founded in 1998. The company is 100% owned by the US Nexcom Telecommunications, LLC, one of the first operators in the world, developing the Voice over Internet protocol technology (VoIP). Nexcom is the first operator in Bulgaria, providing products and services, based on the VoIP technology. Prior to selling its wholesale operations in 2003, Nexcom was the leading alternative telecommunications provider in 12 countries throughout Central and Eastern Europe.

The company is licensed by the Communications Regulation Commission for a full range of telecommunication services, giving the opportunity for a complete replacement of the incumbent telecommunications operator. A part of the licenses, owned by Nexcom are:

 a license for fixed telephony, which authorizes the company to build, maintain and utilize fixed telephone network, and to offer voice service with national coverage for the period of 20 years;
 a license for access to voice telephone service through carrier selection;
 a data transfer license;
 class B license for the new wireless technology point-to-multipoint, enabling the company to build a national WiMAX network. This network serves as an alternative last mile for transfer of voice, data and video to the end client.

Nexcom Bulgaria owns international and national networks for voice and data transfer. The company has its own offices and access points in 19 cities in Bulgaria.

Currently Nexcom Bulgaria offers telephony, broadband Internet access, virtual private networks, etc.

Telecommunications companies of Bulgaria
Telecommunications companies established in 1998